Merry Go Round in Oz (1963) is the fortieth in the series of Oz books created by L. Frank Baum and his successors. It was written by Eloise Jarvis McGraw and Lauren McGraw Wagner (her married name was dropped from reprinted editions after the marriage ended). It was illustrated by Dick Martin.

Merry Go Round in Oz is the last of the "Famous Forty" and the last "official" Oz book.  Reilly & Lee had declined offers from many other writers, including previous author Rachel R. Cosgrove, to publish a fortieth Oz book because of poor sales, but were persuaded by McGraw's two Newbery Awards to admit a fortieth book into the series.  The first edition, the so-called "white edition," is the rarest book in the series in its original printings.

Synopsis
Halidom and Troth are two adjacent principalities within the Land of Oz, both resembling medieval kingdoms. Heir to the throne of Halidom is Prince Gules. The people of Halidom have always derived their physical and mental abilities from three golden circlets worn by their ruler: the first around his forehead, the second on his right forearm, the third on his right thumb.  The first circlet confers intelligence upon all the citizens of Halidom, the second confers physical strength and fighting prowess; the third confers manual dexterity and craftsmanship. The first and third circlets have been lost before the beginning of the book, with attendant loss of abilities by the subjects of Halidom.

Fess is a young pageboy in the household of Prince Gules, but Fess was born in Troth, so the circlets have no effect on him. Awakening one day to discover that all the natives of Halidom are strangely languid, Fess learns that the second (and last remaining) circlet has been stolen. He embarks on a quest with Prince Gules, aided by a unicorn and a Flittermouse (a mouse with wings) to retrieve all three.

Meanwhile, Dorothy Gale and the Cowardly Lion temporarily leave the Emerald City to place an order with the Easter Bunny, whose underground domain is conveniently accessible from Oz.  Having placed the order, they get lost on the way back, and meet and join the Prince and Fess in their quest.

Robin Brown, an orphan from Oregon, USA, rides a magic merry-go-round horse to the Land of Oz. The horse whisks him to the Quadling and Munchkin Countries of Oz, where Robin has adventures in View Halloo (a region dedicated to fox-hunting) and Roundabout (a land where everything is round, inhabited by Roundheads).  The Roundheads mistake him for a new king foretold by a prophecy, and force him to remain there and serve as their king. Dorothy's party happens on Roundabout and help Robin to escape. Eventually, Robin must help find the missing magic circlets of Halidom.

Reception 
Merry Go Round in Oz received a largely critical review in Kirkus Reviews, which wrote, "Strange amalgam. Take one large portion of The Wonderful Wizard of Oz, lend in a half portion, diluted, of King Arthur and The Knights of the Round Table, a dash of Alice — then close your eyes and take a long swallow".

References

External links

 On Merry Go Round in Oz

Oz (franchise) books
1963 American novels
1963 fantasy novels
Fiction about unicorns
1963 children's books